Pachytriton moi is a species of salamander in the family Salamandridae. It is endemic to Guangxi, China, and known from its type locality, Huaping National Nature Reserve in Longsheng County, and from Mao'er Mountain in Ziyuan County.

References

moi
Amphibians of China
Endemic fauna of Guangxi
Amphibians described in 2011